Listed below are the colleges and universities with the most AIAW top-level sanctioned team championships.  Before the NCAA began sponsoring women's collegiate sports, the AIAW operated as a national organizing body, conducted tournaments, and awarded national championships for women's sports from 1972 to 1982. Its predecessor within the same overall organization was the Division for Girls' and Women's Sports (DGWS), which sponsored competition and conducted team championships in eight sports from the 1967–68 year through the winter of the 1971–72 year, at which time the AIAW came into being. The table below includes AIAW and DGWS championships won both before and after the existence of divisions. Results are included for the Large College Division, which was later renamed Division I.

AIAW Division I team championships 
The schools on this list currently compete in NCAA Division I except where noted.

13 schools with two titles each: Arizona §, Cal State Fullerton, Clarion State, Florida, Middlebury, North Carolina State, Old Dominion, Pasadena City College, Prairie View A&M, Stanford, Sul Ross State, Tulsa, Utah.30 schools with one title each: Cal State Hayward, Colorado, Dartmouth, Furman, Hawaii, Illinois, Indiana, Louisiana Tech, Maryland, Massachusetts, Michigan State, Mississippi State College for Women, Nebraska, North Carolina, North Carolina Greensboro, Northern Illinois, Northern Iowa, Omaha, Rollins, Rutgers, Southern Methodist, Southwest Missouri State, Temple, Tennessee, Texas A&M, Texas El Paso, Vermont, Virginia, Washington, Yale.† No divisions (most sports) in 1967–1979 (includes DGWS). Large College Division (5 sports only) in 1974 (varies)–1979. Division I in 1979–1982* Now competes in NCAA Division II.‡ Now competes in NCAA Division III.§ Includes a tie for the 1980 synchronized swimming title.Note: John F. Kennedy College won the first three softball national championships in 1969–71. The school closed in 1975.

Sports with AIAW/DGWS team championships by year

See also
List of NCAA schools with the most Division I national championships
List of NCAA schools with the most NCAA Division I championships

References

College sports championships in the United States